Johnson–Denny House, also known as the Johnson-Manfredi House, is a historic home located at Indianapolis, Marion County, Indiana.  It was built in 1862, and is a two-story, five bay, "T"-shaped, frame dwelling with Italianate style design elements.  It has a bracketed gable roof and a two-story rear addition.  It features a vestibule added in 1920.  Also on the property is a contributing -story garage, originally built as a carriage house. It was originally built by Oliver Johnson, noted for the Oliver Johnson's Woods Historic District.

It was added to the National Register of Historic Places in 1979.

References

Individually listed contributing properties to historic districts on the National Register in Indiana
Houses on the National Register of Historic Places in Indiana
Italianate architecture in Indiana
Houses completed in 1862
Houses in Indianapolis
National Register of Historic Places in Indianapolis